The St. George Dukes are a Junior ice hockey team based in St. George, Ontario, Canada.  They play in the Niagara & District Junior C Hockey League of the Ontario Hockey Association.

History
The Dukes were founded in 1994 as members of the OHA Junior Development League.

In 2006, the OHAJDL was dissolved and the Dukes joined the Southern Ontario Junior Hockey League.

The Dukes have been working with the Cambridge Winter Hawks Jr.B club for many years. And for that, have brought in such former Winter Hawk players as Chris Vasile, Shawn Little, and Andrew Swaniga.

In the summer of 2012, the Dukes, as members of the SOJHL, were promoted to Junior C official by the OHA. Instead of staying with their long time league, the Dukes switched from the SOJHL to the Niagara & District Junior C Hockey League to replace the departed Caledonia Corvairs.

On September 27, 2012, the Dukes played their first official regular season Junior C game, losing 10-3 on the road against the Chippawa Riverhawks.  On September 28, 2012, the Dukes picked up their first ever Junior C victory, a 6-2 road win against the Woodstock Navy-Vets.  On September 29, 2012, the Dukes hosted their first ever home Junior C game, dropping a 6-1 decision to the Grimsby Peach Kings, two-time defending Clarence Schmalz Cup provincial champions, three-time defending Niagara District champions, and ten-time defending Niagara East champions.

The Dukes have elected to sit out the 2013-14 season. They were also unable to put a team together for the 2014-15 season.

Season-by-season standings

References

External links
Dukes Website

Southern Ontario Junior Hockey League teams